The 3 arrondissements of the Seine-Saint-Denis department are:
 Arrondissement of Bobigny, (prefecture of the Seine-Saint-Denis département: Bobigny) with 9 communes.  The population of the arrondissement was 415,958 in 2016.
 Arrondissement of Le Raincy, (subprefecture: Le Raincy) with 22 communes.  The population of the arrondissement was 755,392 in 2016.  
 Arrondissement of Saint-Denis, (subprefecture: Saint-Denis) with 9 communes.  The population of the arrondissement was 435,310 in 2016.

History

In 1800 the arrondissement of Saint-Denis was established as part of the department Seine. In 1962 the arrondissement of Saint-Denis was disbanded, and the arrondissement of Le Raincy was created as part of the department Seine-et-Oise. The arrondissement of Bobigny was created in 1964 as part of the department Seine. In 1968 the department Seine-Saint-Denis was created from parts of the former departments Seine and Seine-et-Oise, and the arrondissements of Bobigny and Le Raincy became part of it. The arrondissement of Saint-Denis was created in February 1993 from part of the arrondissement of Bobigny.

In January 2017 six communes passed from the arrondissement of Bobigny to the arrondissement of Le Raincy.

References

Seine-Saint-Denis